Susie Creek is a southward flowing  stream that begins on the south flank of Lone Mountain in the Independence Mountains and is tributary to the Humboldt River at Carlin in Elko County in northeastern Nevada.

History
A pioneer Scots family, on their overland trek to California in 1849, camped near the stream and named four creeks, including Susie Creek, Maggie Creek, Mary Creek, and Amelia Creek after their four daughters.

Watershed
The Susie Creek watershed drains .

Ecology
Maggie and Susie Creeks, which enter the Humboldt River near Carlin, have benefited from 20 years of work by ranchers, agencies, mines, and non-profit groups via improvements in grazing techniques and specific projects. These projects, which include installation of fish passable culverts, have led to the return of migrating Lahontan cutthroat trout (LCT, Onchorhynchus clarkii henshawi).

North American beaver (Castor canadensis) seem to have been making a comeback in Elko County possibly due to less fur trapping combined with reduced consumption of riparian willow and other vegetation by cattle. Stream flows are more perennial, making more water available for wildlife and livestock and protecting populations of native trout. By working with satellite imagery and aerial photography, Trout Unlimited was able to compare conditions from as far back as 20 to 30 years ago to conditions in 2013. For the Susie Creek Basin as whole, riparian vegetation increased by over 100 acres, beaver dams increased from zero to 139, aerial extent of open water increased by over 20 acres and length of wetted stream increased by almost three miles.

References

Rivers of Nevada
Rivers of Elko County, Nevada